Gabriela Reyes Fuchs (born Carmen Gabriela Reyes Fuchs; April 18, 1986) is a Mexican cinematographer, photographer, artist, and inventor. She is best known as the founder of the Dead Soon, a project that captures images reminiscent of interstellar nebulae when photographing the ashes of the deceased. She owns the patent for this process of imaging

Early life and education 
Reyes Fuchs was born on April 18, 1986, in Mexico City, Mexico, to Dr Anselmo Reyes Gallardo and Carmen Patricia Fuchs Gómez. Starting in 1995 at age nine, Reyes Fuchs spent ten years as the pupil of Rosa María Arredondo, who taught her sketching, sculpting, painting and art history.

Higher education 
In 2005, Reyes Fuchs began studying photography at Escuela Activa de Fotografía, later moving into studying film and specialising in cinematography. Part way through her studies she was offered the opportunity to work on a documentary, a decision that saw her drop out of school to pursue hands-on experience. She continued to learn through self-teaching and hands-on experience, to the point that she now gives conferences and master classes on cinematography for brands including ARRI and KinoFlo.

Career 
As a cinematographer, Reyes Fuchs focused on primarily on advertising and documentary filmmaking. In 2008 she began working for the award-winning tourism campaign “Visit Mexico / Come Visit” and “México en tus sentidos”. She has worked as a DOP and Camera Operator for numerous advertising campaigns, documentaries, and short films. She is also a member of Apertura, the Mexican Society of Female Cinematographers.

Reyes Fuchs is a public speaker and has given several TedxTalks, as well as different conferences including FICG (International Film Festival of Guadalajara), Concordia University, and Universidad de la Comunicación.

Filmography

Dead Soon| Innerstela 
Reyes Fuchs captured an array of multicoloured nebulae when she looked at her father's ashes, utilising a bright field microscope at UNAM’s MicroFilm Lab with the support of Alejandro Martinez, Director UNAM's MicroFilm Lab.

Awards 
Reyes Fuchs has received nominations for Best Cinematography and was awarded Best Cinematography at the 2016 Asia Short Film Festival for her work on Mura-Mura, directed by Ragnar Chacin.

She has been awarded several prizes and scholarships including: FONCA Artistic Residency 2014 Banff Centre for the Arts, CONACULTA Coproduction Grant in Co-production with CONCORDIA University Topological Media Lab 2015–2016, SBCAST AIR 2018, and SBCAST AIR 2019.

Personal life 
Since 2011, Reyes Fuchs is an practising student of Tibetan Buddhism, under the guidance of Zasep Tulku Rinpoche.

She has lived and worked in several countries, including Canada, USA, Mongolia, and Korea. In her spare time she enjoys meditating, rock climbing, and diving.

References 

1986 births
Living people
Mexican cinematographers
Mexican inventors
Mexican women artists
Mexican photographers
Women cinematographers